The Ultra-Lightweight TT was a motorcycle road race that took place during the Isle of Man TT festival, an annual event at the end of May and beginning of June. Between 1951 and 1974 this race was part of the Grand Prix motorcycle racing season at world-level, representing the British round. The Ultra-Lightweight TT and the Lightweight TT races were both dropped from the 2005 Isle of Man TT race calendar due to lack of entries, but were later reinstated to the 2008 and 2009 TT race schedules held on the  Billown Circuit.

Engine Capacity
The Ultra-Lightweight TT race was re-introduced for the 1951 Isle of Man TT race for motorcycles not exceeding 125 cc engine capacity until dropped from the TT race meeting in 1974. The Ultra-Lightweight race was re-introduced for the 1989 TT races, again for motorcycles not exceeding 125 cc engine capacity and was part of the TT Festival until 2004.

 1924-1925 For motor-cycles not exceeding 175 cc engine capacity.
 1951-1953 World Championship event for motorcycles not exceeding 125 cc engine capacity, held on the Snaefell mountain course.
 1954-1959 World Championship event for motorcycles not exceeding 125 cc engine capacity, held on the Clypse Course.
 1960-1974 World Championship event for motor-cycles not exceeding 125 cc engine capacity, held on the Mountain Course.
 1989-2004 for motorcycles not exceeding 125 cc engine capacity, held on the Mountain Course.
 2008-2009 for motorcycles not exceeding 125 cc engine capacity, held on the Billown Circuit.
 1962-1968 Additional World Championship event for motorcycles not exceeding 50 cc engine capacity, held on the Mountain Course.

Speed and Lap Records
The lap record for the Ultra-Lightweight TT is 19 minutes and 18.2 seconds at an average speed of  set by Chris Palmer during the 2004 Ultra-Lightweight 125 cc TT Race.

List of Ultra-Lightweight TT Winners

50cc Ultra-Lightweight TT Winners

Ultra-Lightweight TT Race Winners

 *Indicates Ultra-Lightweight TT wins on the Clypse Course.

Ultra-Lightweight TT Race Winners by Marque

References

See also
TTXGP
Lightweight TT
Sidecar TT
Junior TT
Senior TT